Eye magazine is a quarterly print magazine on graphic design and visual culture.

History 

First published in London in 1990, Eye was founded by Rick Poynor, a prolific writer on graphic design and visual communication. Poynor edited the first twenty-four issues (1990–1997). Max Bruinsma was the second editor, editing issues 25–32 (1997–1999), before its current editor John L. Walters took over in 1999. Stephen Coates was art director for issues 1–26, Nick Bell was art director from issues 27–57, and Simon Esterson has been art director since issue 58.

Frequent contributors include Phil Baines, Steven Heller, John-Patrick Hartnett, Richard Hollis, Paul Kahn, Robin Kinross, Jan Middendorp, J. Abbott Miller, John O'Reilly, Rick Poynor, Elizabeth Resnick, Alice Twemlow, Kerry William Purcell, Steve Rigley, Adrian Shaughnessy, David Thompson, Christopher Wilson, Steve Hare and many others. Recent issues have included photographs by Philip Sayer, Maria Spann and Francesco Brembati.  

Other contributors have included Nick Bell (creative director from issues 27-57), whose article "The steamroller of branding" (published in Eye 53, the "Brand madness" special issue) is frequently cited in discussions about branding. Other contributors have included Louise Sandhaus, Gavin Bryars, Anne Burdick, Brendan Dawes, Simon Esterson (art director since issue 58), Malcolm Garrett, Anna Gerber, Jonathan Jones, Emily King, Ellen Lupton, Russell Mills, Quentin Newark, Tom Phillips, Robin Rimbaud, Stefan Sagmeister, Sue Steward, Erik Spiekermann, Teal Triggs, Val Williams and Judith Williamson.

The magazine has had five publishers: Wordsearch, Emap, Quantum Publishing, Haymarket Brand Media and Eye Magazine Ltd, formed by John L. Walters, Simon Esterson and Hannah Tyson in April 2008, after a management buyout.

See also 
Communication Arts (magazine)
Emigre magazine
Graphis Inc.
Print (magazine)
Visible Language
John L. Walters

References

Sources 
 Eye, Nos. 1–12, edited by Rick Poynor, Wordsearch Ltd, London, 1991–1994.
 Eye, Nos. 13–17, edited by Rick Poynor, Emap Architecture, London, 1994–1995.
 Eye, Nos. 18–24, edited by Rick Poynor, Emap Construct, London, 1995–1997.
 Eye, No. 25, edited by Max Bruinsma, Emap Construct, London, 1997.
 Eye, Nos. 26–32, edited by Max Bruinsma, Quantum Publishing, London, 1997–1999.
 Eye, Nos. 33–55, edited by John L. Walters, Quantum Publishing, London, 1999–2005.
 Eye, Nos. 56–66, edited by John L. Walters, Haymarket Brand Media, London, 2005–2008.
 Eye, Nos. 67–102, edited by John L. Walters, Eye Magazine Ltd., London, 2008–2021.
 "John L Walters, Eye", magCulture, 18 August 2017.
 Madeleine Morley, "Cover Story: What the Stack Awards Winner Tells us About the New Rules of Magazine Design", Eye on Design, 21 November 2017.
 MuirMcNeil generated 100 unique Indigo prints from the ten typographic fields designed for Eye 94's 8000 variable-data front covers.
 Article about Eye 94 by Beatriz Camargo
 John L. Walters: The Editor Who Keeps An “Eye” On Graphic Design Worldwide. The Mr. Magazine™ Interview.

External links
 EyeMagazine.com
 Eye Magazine Blog
 Eye Shop run by ESco Ltd

1990 establishments in the United Kingdom
Communication design
Design magazines
Graphic design
Magazines established in 1990
Magazines published in London
Quarterly magazines published in the United Kingdom
Visual arts magazines published in the United Kingdom